Gustav Rau may refer to:
 Gustav Rau (art collector) (1922–2002), German doctor, philanthropist and art collector
 Gustav Rau (athlete) (1878–?), German athlete
 Gustav Rau (hippologist) (1880–1954), German hippologist